Prešov railway station (Slovak Železničná stanica Prešov) is a railway station in the city of Prešov in Prešov Region, third biggest city in Slovakia.

Description 
Station was opened in 1872. It serves daily connections of local and express trains in direction to Bratislava and Košice.

In 2007, building and platforms became completely reconstructed and the parking lot is also planned. The station also has a cash desk for the sale of national and international tickets, luggage storage, and there are several refreshment points, a restaurant and a waiting room.

Sources

 Database of Slovakian railway stations 
 Article about reconstruction of the station 

Railway Station
Railway stations in Prešov Region
Railway stations opened in 1872
Buildings and structures in Prešov Region
Railway stations in Slovakia opened in the 19th century